Kolesov may refer to
Kolesov (surname)
Kolesov RD-36-51, a supersonic turbojet engine
Kolešov, a village and municipality in the Czech Republic